is a trilogy that is one of the best examples of Turkish Psychedelic Cinema of 1970s, directed by Remzi Aydın Jöntürk and starring Cüneyt Arkın as Çakır.

The trilogy includes:
 Yarınsız Adam (Man Without Tomorrow)
 Satılmış Adam (Sold Man)
 Yıkılmayan Adam (Indestructible Man)

They are, "politically engaged films", that tell the story of the class struggles in Turkey in the late 1970s with an open style.

References

Film series introduced in 1976
Film series
Trilogies